Sándor Szobolevszky (1907 – December 1946) was a Hungarian boxer. He competed in the men's lightweight event at the 1928 Summer Olympics.

References

1907 births
1946 deaths
Hungarian male boxers
Olympic boxers of Hungary
Boxers at the 1928 Summer Olympics
Boxers from Budapest
Lightweight boxers
Date of birth missing